Yousef Alavi (March 19, 1928 – May 21, 2013) was an Iranian born American mathematician who specialized in combinatorics and graph theory.  He received his PhD from Michigan State University in 1958. He was a professor of mathematics at Western Michigan University from 1958 until his retirement in 1996; he chaired the department from 1989 to 1992.

In 1987 he received the first Distinguished Service Award of the Michigan Section of the Mathematical Association of America due to his 30 years of service to the MAA; at that time, the Michigan House and Senate issued a special resolution honoring him.

References

20th-century American mathematicians
Combinatorialists
2013 deaths
Michigan State University alumni
Western Michigan University faculty
1928 births